Paratilapia typus is a species of fish in the family Cichlidae. It is endemic to Madagascar.  Its natural habitat is rivers. It is threatened by habitat loss.

Sources
 Loiselle, P. & participants of the CBSG/ANGAP CAMP "Faune de Madagascar" workshop 2004.  Paratilapia typus.   2006 IUCN Red List of Threatened Species.   Downloaded on 4 August 2007.

Paratilapia
Freshwater fish of Madagascar
Fish described in 1878
Taxonomy articles created by Polbot